Steven Tetsuo Kariya (born December 22, 1977) is a Canadian former professional ice hockey winger and younger brother of former National Hockey League player Paul Kariya. Kariya was born in North Vancouver, British Columbia.

Playing career
After playing Junior A with the Nanaimo Clippers, he joined the college hockey ranks with the University of Maine Black Bears. In his senior year, he captained the Black Bears and led them to an NCAA title in 1999.

Having not been drafted by an NHL team, he was signed as a free agent by the Vancouver Canucks and played three-and-a-half years within the organization. During the 2004–05 NHL lockout, Kariya went overseas to play for Ilves Tampere of the Finnish SM-liiga and won the Veli-Pekka Ketola trophy as the league's top point-scorer. Remaining in Finland, he played one-season stints with the Espoo Blues, HPK, and JYP, with whom he last played during the 2009–10 season. He also played for Frölunda HC of the Swedish Elitserien for two seasons.

On March 1, 2013, Kariya joined the Portland Winterhawks coaching staff

Personal
Kariya's sister Noriko is a professional boxer and his brother Martin is also a professional hockey player. He and Martin are the first and only brothers to have won the Veli-Pekka Ketola trophy. Steve is the brother of Paul Kariya.

Awards and honors

 Awarded the NCAA Hockey East Sportsmanship Award in 1997, 1998 and 1999.
 NCAA Champion with University of Maine in 1999.
 Awarded the Veli-Pekka Ketola trophy (Most points in SM-liiga) in 2005.

Career statistics

References

External links
 

1977 births
Albany River Rats players
Canadian expatriate ice hockey players in Finland
Canadian expatriate ice hockey players in Sweden
Canadian ice hockey left wingers
Canadian people of Scottish descent
Canadian sportspeople of Japanese descent
Espoo Blues players
Frölunda HC players
Ice hockey people from British Columbia
Ilves players
Kansas City Blades players
Living people
Maine Black Bears men's ice hockey players
Manitoba Moose players
New Jersey Devils scouts
Sportspeople from North Vancouver
Syracuse Crunch players
Undrafted National Hockey League players
Vancouver Canucks players
AHCA Division I men's ice hockey All-Americans
NCAA men's ice hockey national champions